The Anheuser-Busch Beer Depot is located at 1207-1215 Jones Street in downtown Omaha, Nebraska. Omaha architect Henry Voss designed the complex for the Anheuser-Busch Brewing Association of St. Louis, Missouri in 1887.

Once covering more than a block, today the Anheuser-Busch Office Building is the only remaining structure of what was the original Krug Brewery, the largest brewery among Omaha's original "Big 4" brewers. Anheuser-Busch took over the facilities after buying Krug. The office building is one of the most elaborate examples of the Romanesque Revival style in Omaha. The Depot once included a stable, beer vault/ice house, famous gold basement and cobblestone alley.

See also
History of Omaha

References

National Register of Historic Places in Omaha, Nebraska
History of Downtown Omaha, Nebraska
Industrial buildings completed in 1887
Anheuser-Busch
Beer brewing companies based in Omaha, Nebraska
Romanesque Revival architecture in Nebraska
Commercial buildings on the National Register of Historic Places in Nebraska